Tyromyces chioneus, commonly known as the white cheese polypore, is a species of polypore fungus. A widely distributed fungus, it has a circumpolar distribution, in temperate boreal pine forests, of Asia, Europe, and North America, causes white rot in dead hardwood trees, especially birch.

Taxonomy
The species was first described as Polyporus chioneus by Elias Fries in 1815. It was transferred to the genus Tyromyces by Petter Karsten in 1881.
Tyromyces chioneus is the type species of Tyromyces. The specific epithet chioneus means "snow", referring to its white color. It is commonly known as the "white cheese polypore".

Description

The upper surface is initially white before aging to yellowish or grayish, and has a texture ranging from smooth to tomentose. The undersurface features white to cream-colored, round to angular pores measuring 3–4 per millimeter. The flesh is soft and fleshy when young, but becomes hard and brittle in age or when dry. It has a mild or indistinct taste, and a pleasant odor.

It has a white spore print, and the spores are smooth, cylindrical, hyaline (translucent), with dimensions of 4–5 by 1.5–2 µm. The basidia are club-shaped, four-spored, and measure 10–15 by 4–5 µm; they have a clamp at their base. The hyphal system is dimitic, consisting of generative and skeletal hyphae. The generative hyphae have clamps and are intricately branched. The skeletal hyphae, in contrast, are thick-walled, rarely branched, and measure 2–4.5 µm in diameter. Although cystidia are absent from the hymenium, there are fused cystidioles (immature cystidia) measuring 15–20 by 4–5 µm.

The species is inedible.

Habitat and distribution
Tyromyces chioneus causes white rot in dead hardwood trees. Its most common host is birch. The species has a circumpolar distribution, in temperate boreal pine forests, including Asia, Europe, and North America. In Greenland, it is common on Betula pubescens.

Chemistry
Cultures of the fungus have been shown to contain a sesquiterpene with anti-HIV activity in laboratory experiments.

References

Fungi described in 1815
Fungi of Europe
Fungi of North America
Fungal tree pathogens and diseases
Inedible fungi
chioneus
Taxa named by Elias Magnus Fries